Molycria is a genus of Australian ground spiders that was first described by Eugène Louis Simon in 1887.

Species
 it contains thirty-six species, found in the Northern Territory, Western Australia, South Australia, New South Wales, and Queensland:
Molycria amphi Platnick & Baehr, 2006 – Australia (Queensland)
Molycria broadwater Platnick & Baehr, 2006 – Australia (Queensland, New South Wales)
Molycria bulburin Platnick & Baehr, 2006 – Australia (Queensland)
Molycria bundjalung Platnick & Baehr, 2006 – Australia (New South Wales)
Molycria burwelli Platnick & Baehr, 2006 – Australia (Queensland)
Molycria canonba Platnick & Baehr, 2006 – Australia (Queensland, New South Wales)
Molycria cleveland Platnick & Baehr, 2006 – Australia (Queensland)
Molycria cooki Platnick & Baehr, 2006 – Australia (Queensland)
Molycria dalby Platnick & Baehr, 2006 – Australia (Queensland, New South Wales)
Molycria daviesae Platnick & Baehr, 2006 – Australia (Queensland)
Molycria dawson Platnick & Baehr, 2006 – Australia (Queensland)
Molycria drummond Platnick & Baehr, 2006 – Australia (Queensland)
Molycria goanna Platnick & Baehr, 2006 – Australia (Queensland, New South Wales)
Molycria grayi Platnick & Baehr, 2006 – Australia (Queensland, New South Wales, Lord Howe Is.)
Molycria isla Platnick & Baehr, 2006 – Australia (Queensland)
Molycria kaputar Platnick & Baehr, 2006 – Australia (New South Wales)
Molycria mammosa (O. Pickard-Cambridge, 1874) (type) – Australia (New South Wales, Capital Territory)
Molycria mcleani Platnick & Baehr, 2006 – Australia (Queensland)
Molycria milledgei Platnick & Baehr, 2006 – Australia (New South Wales)
Molycria moffatt Platnick & Baehr, 2006 – Australia (Queensland)
Molycria monteithi Platnick & Baehr, 2006 – Australia (Queensland)
Molycria moranbah Platnick & Baehr, 2006 – Australia (Queensland)
Molycria nipping Platnick & Baehr, 2006 – Australia (Queensland)
Molycria quadricauda (Simon, 1908) – Southern Australia
Molycria raveni Platnick & Baehr, 2006 – Australia (Queensland)
Molycria robert Platnick & Baehr, 2006 – Australia (Queensland)
Molycria smithae Platnick & Baehr, 2006 – Australia (New South Wales)
Molycria stanisici Platnick & Baehr, 2006 – Australia (Queensland)
Molycria taroom Platnick & Baehr, 2006 – Australia (Queensland)
Molycria thompsoni Platnick & Baehr, 2006 – Australia (Queensland)
Molycria tooloombah Platnick & Baehr, 2006 – Australia (Queensland)
Molycria upstart Platnick & Baehr, 2006 – Australia (Queensland)
Molycria vokes Platnick & Baehr, 2006 – Australia (Western Australia, Northern Territory, South Australia)
Molycria wallacei Platnick & Baehr, 2006 – Australia (Queensland)
Molycria wardeni Platnick & Baehr, 2006 – Australia (Queensland)
Molycria wrightae Platnick & Baehr, 2006 – Australia (Queensland)

See also
 List of Gnaphosidae species

References

Araneomorphae genera
Gnaphosidae